Talikatte is a village in the Holalkere Taluk of Chitradurga District in Karnataka. About 1400 families live in this village. Majority of people living in this village belong to the Kuruba Gowda caste.

It's a remote village with no buses plying to it.

It has become famous all over India as the village home to about 800 teachers. No other village in India has produced so many teachers. Each family in the village has at least one person in the teaching profession. The teachers of Talikatte have settled all over Karnataka.

References

Villages in Chitradurga district